There have been narrow-gauge railways which used ,  and  gauges.

The older rail network was in Melilla–Nador area, only later to join with another, the Ceuta–Tetuan railway line and short harbour construction lines at the Larache Harbour on the Atlantic seaboard.

After the Treaty of Algeciras signed in April 1906, where the northern part of Morocco was placed under Spanish administration, the Spanish started to develop this mineral-rich area. The Spanish Line (Compañía Transatlántica Española) had been formed in Spain as early as in 1881 by Spanish businessman Antonio López y López. The main idea was to develop the harbours in northern Morocco to carry more Spanish–Moroccan trade via harbours of Larache, Tanger, Ceuta and Melilla.

Melilla area

Junta de Obras del Puerto de Melilla 
At Melilla the Junta de Obras del Puerto de Melilla started at ones extensive building of harbour to carry mineral traffic overseas, mainly to Spain. With new harbour installations the company built also  gauge local 4.1 km harbour line from Melilla Harbour to Sidi-Musa, later extended to the total length of 7 km as demanded by Spanish military.

The Junta de Obras and the Compañía Transatlántica were merged to form a new company, the Junta de Fomento de Melilla in December 1911.

Compañía Española de Minas del Rif 
The Compañía Española de Minas del Rif was founded in July 1908. It had obtained mining rights at Idem, Beni-Sidel and Mazuza areas. The company built an extensive railway network in the Melilla area. The  gauge main line Melilla–Beni Ensar–Tizi Tavessart–Atalayon–Nador–Segagnan–San Juan de las Minas–Minas de Jebel Uisai (Ulad Canem) 31,5 km was the first common carrier railway in Spanish Morocco between Melilla and San Juan de las Minas.

In spring 1914 the Compañía Española de Minas del Rif operated three daily passenger trains to Nador of which two continued to San Juan de las Minas with corresponding return workings to Melilla.

Ferrocarril Nador–Tistutin 
Another company, the Ferrocarril Nador–Tistutin, built a  gauge 36 km Nador–Tinequemart–Zeluan–Monte Arruit–Tistutin–El Batel line.

There was continuous unrest in the area and the Rif Cabyle rebellionists attacked against the railways.  The Spanish Army concentrated nearly 100.000 soldiers to pacify the Rif area and built extensions westward from:
 El Batel to Laababda and Zoco el Had
 El Batel to Ben Tiep
 Laababda to Dar Tafersit
The lines were operated by locotractors which could haul 200 tons with three locotractors.

Later, it had been decided to be built to standard  gauge field railways and the Spanish Army bought a number of surplus former German built World War I locomotives and rolling stock from Germany. The following lines were constructed:
 El Batel–Dar Driuch 23.5 km
 El Batel–Ulad Candussi–Dar Quebdani 23 km
 Dar Driuch–Tafersit 12 km
When the area was finally pacified in 1926 the lines were lifted and the rolling stock transferred elsewhere.

Compañía del Norte Africano and the Compañía Minera Setolazar 
There were also two other companies which operated their own mining railways. The Compañía del Norte Africano and the Compañía Minera Setolazar, both of  gauge. Both companies had a common locomotive shed at Beni Ensar. Their  gauge line run parallel with Compañía Española de Minas del Rif  gauge line between Nador and Melilla Harbour.

Compañía del Norte Africano 
Compañía del Norte Africano  gauge industrial railway served the lead mines at Monte Afra with company's Melilla–Nador–Monte Afra line on the north coast.  This company was founded in August 1907. The length of this lead carrier was 19 km.

Ceuta area

Ferrocarril Ceuta–Benzu (Junta de Obras del Puerto de Ceuta) 
Farther west the Junta de Obras del Puerto de Ceuta was founded in October 1904. It built Ceuta Harbour and later a short branch line from Ceuta to nearby Benzú. The company used  gauge line.

Ferrocarril Ceuta–Tetuan 
The Ferrocarril Ceuta–Tetuan was founded in September 1912 to connect Ceuta to Tetuan with 41 km  gauge railway. The line was opened March 1918. Ferrocarril Ceuta–Tetuan built stations at Ceuta (0.5 km), Miramar (2.9 km), Castillejos  8.0 km), Dar Riffen (11.1 km), Negro (13.8 km), Rincon del Medik (24.9 km), Malalien (38.1 km), and terminal station Tetuan (41.0 km).

Ferrocarril Tetuan–Rio Martin y prolongaciones 
When Spanish General Alfau occupied Tetuan in 1913 it was decided to build an 18 km  gauge railway to Rio Martin using the trackbed of the former lifted standard-gauge railway. The 10 km Ferrocarril Tetuan–Rio Martin y prolongaciones was opened in May 1915 for public service. The extensions south to Benkarrir and Zina 18 km was opened in March 1921 and west to Laucien 8 km, when the railway bridge at Mogote was finally completed, on the same day.

Larache area

Larache harbour installations 
The Austrian company Sager & Wörner had obtained from the Spanish Government the contract to build the harbour installations at Larache on the Atlantic coast in 1911. The harbour was built in 1911–1914 with a  railway but World War I delayed the 34 km standard-gauge railway line to Larache to 1922.

Narrow-gauge locomotives delivered to former Spanish Morocco 

ALCo
 6 ALCo  2C-h2 17x20, built 1917, 48 Delivered to the Spanish Colonies

Avonside
 Avonside  Ct-n2, built 1906, ex FC de Sierra Nevada, sold to Minas del Rif " MELILLA "

Borsig
 1 Borsig  Bt-n2, built 1906 Arthur Koppel AG, Berlin f. Tanger, Marokko
 2 Borsig  1Ct-n2, built 1911, Ferrocarril Nador–Tistutin No 1 " TISTUTIN "

Carels
 1 Carels  Ctr-n2, built 1887, ex Baix Emporda, Tranvia del Bajo Ampurdan a Palamos No 2 -> FC Minas del Rif

CUA
 2 Couillet , Bt-n2, built 1899, ex Chemins de Fer Espagne sp. Maroc, Melilla
 2 CUA (Christop & Unmack Aktiengesellschaft), B´2 Motor wagon, built 1943, f. Ferrocarril Ceuta a Tetuan 

Deutz
 Deutz, B type ML 116-Tr, built 1925, Compania Espanola de Minas del Rif
 5 Deutz, B type ML 128-F, built 1925–1926, Compania Espanola de Minas del Rif
 4 Deutz, B type MLH228-F, built 1927–1928, Compania Espanola de Minas del Rif
 8 Deutz, B type MLH233-F  built 1928–1929, Compania Espanola de Minas del Rif
 3 Deutz, B type MLH230-F  built 1930, Compania Espanola de Minas del Rif
 7 Deutz, B type MLH332-F, built 1934–1938, Compania Espanola de Minas del Rif
 1 Deutz, BB type OMD130-F, built 1934, Compania Espanola de Minas del Rif No 301
 2 Deutz, B type GG66-B, built 1965, Compania Espanola de Minas del Rif

Falcon
 Falcon 144 / 1887 1000 C-n2 originally Ct-n2 origin unknown 1909 to FC Nador–Tistutin No 6 " EUSKALLERIA "

General Motors
 2 General Motors, CoCo type GL22CU, built 1971, Societe d´Exploitation des Mines du Rif

Henschel
 20 Henschel, Bt-n2, built 1918, ex Tigris Kriegsbahn delivered in 1921 to Spanish Morocco
 2 Henschel, 1C1t-n2, built 1920, Minas del Rif, Melilla
 3 Henschel, 1D1t-n2, built 1921, Minas del Rif
 3 Henschel, Dt-n2, built 1922, Metallges. Frankfurt am Main for Spanish Morocco
 2 Henschel, Ct-n2, built 1922, Metallges. Frankfurt am Main for Spanish Morocco, for FC Nador–Tistutin
 1 Henschel, Ct-n2, built 1923, Minas del Rif No 11, Spanish Morocco
 1 Henschel, 2D2t-n2, built 1924,  Minas del Rif, No 203 Melilla, Spanish Morocco
 2 Henschel, Dt-n2, built 1924–1925, Spanish Morocco
 3 Henschel, Ct-n2, built 1925, Delegation de Romento, Spanish Morocco
 1 Henschel, Bt-n2, built 1925, Delegation de Romento, Spanish Morocco
 2 Henschel, Dt-n2, built 1928, Ferr. Sideguza, Madrid for Spanish Morocco
 3 Henschel, Ct-n2, built 1928–1929, Minas del Rif, Spanish Morocco
 2 Henschel, 2D2t-n2, built 1934, Minas del Rif, Spanish Morocco

Kerr Stuart
 2 Kerr Stuart, 1C-n2, built 1911–1912,  Minas del Rif

Krauss-Maffei
 2Krauss, Ctr-n2, built 1887, ex Tram Bajo Amburdan–sold Minas del Rif
 4 Krauss, Bt-n2, built 1911–1912,  Sager & Wörner, Munchen f. Hafenbau Larache, Spanisch Marokko

MAN
 2 MAN, B´2 Motor wagon, built 1955,  for Ferrocarril Ceuta a Tetuan No 1

Manning Wardle
 2 Manning Wardle, Ct-n2, built 1915, Minas del Rif

MTM
 2 MTM, 1C-n2, built 1913, Ferrocarril Nador (MTM = La Maqiunista Terreatre y Maritima SA, Barcelona)

La Meuse
 5 La Meuse, 1D-n2, built 1929, S.A. Minera Setolazar, Maroc Espagne
 2 La Meuse, Dt-n2, built 1941, built for Krauss–Maffei for Spanish Morocco
 1 La Meuse, B, built 1957, Compania Minera Setolazar, Beni Enzar, Melilla

Orenstein & Koppel
 2 Orenstein & Koppel, Bt-n2, built 1907, Obras del Puerto Melilla
 2 Orenstein & Koppel, Dt-n2+2T, built 1912, Mining exploration Massenet KLA Compania del Norte Africano
 1 Orenstein & Koppel, Bt-n2, built 1909, Messenet Marokko
 1 Orenstein & Koppel, built 1909, Minas del Rif, Melilla, Spanish Morocco
 1 Orenstein & Koppel, built 1911, Compania Espanola de Minas del Rif
 1 Orenstein & Koppel, built 1911, Compania Transatlantice, Melilla, Spanish Morocco
 1 Orenstein & Koppel, built 1911, Junta del Torento de Melilla, Spanish Morocco
 1 Orenstein & Koppel, built 1912, Empresa Constructora del Puerto de Ceuta, Marokko " CEUTA 1 "
 1 Orenstein & Koppel, built 1912, Spanische Regierung (Spanish Morocco)
 2 Orenstein & Koppel, built 1912, F.C. de Nador et Tistutin
 1 Orenstein & Koppel, built 1913, Empresa Constructora del Puerto de Ceuta, Morocco " CEUTA 2 "
 3 Orenstein & Koppel, built 1913, Spanisches Kriegsministerium Madrid, for Spanish Morocco
 1 Orenstein & Koppel, built 1914, Auststellung Lyon, sp. FC Nador a Tistutin No 5 " NADOR "
 1 Orenstein & Koppel, Ct-n2, built 1913, Ministerio de la Guerra, Spanish Morocco
 2 Orenstein & Koppel, built 1913, durch Schneider & Co, nach Marokko
 2 Orenstein & Koppel, Dt-n2, built 1916, Compania del Norte Africano No 11 " YOUKSEN I "
 3 Orenstein & Koppel, Bt-n2, built 1919, Transatlantic GmbH, Melilla, Spanisch Marokko
 4 Orenstein & Koppel, Dt-n2+2T, built 1922, Kriegsministerium Madrid, f. Spanisch Marokko
 1 Orenstein & Koppel, Ct-n2, built 1922, Kolonialministerium Madrid, f. Spanisch Marokko
 1 Orenstein & Koppel, Ct-n2, built 1923, Compania Espanola de Minas del Rif, Span. Marokko
 3 Orenstein & Koppel, Bt-n2, built 1925, Empresa Constructora Puerto de Ceuta
 1 Orenstein & Koppel, Bt-n2, built 1929, Compania Espanola de Minas del Rif, Marokko
 1 Orenstein & Koppel, Ct-n2, built 1931, Ste Nationale d´Travaux Publics, Ceuta, Morocco
 1 Orenstein & Koppel, built 1938, S.A. Minera Setolazar, Bilbao f. Spanish Morocco
 1 Orenstein & Koppel, MVO B, built 1955, Compania Espanola de Minas del Rif

Literature 
 Jose Manuel Vidal Perez & Joan Alberich Gonzales: Los Ferrocarriles en Protectoradas y Colonias Espanolas en Africa 
 E.D.Brant: Railways in North Africa 
 A.E.Durrant, A.A.Jorgensen, C.P.Lewis: Steam in Africa 
 Klaus Fricks, Roland Bude, Martin Murray: O&K Steam Locomotives Works List 1892–1945 
 Bernhard Schmeiser: Krauss-Lokomotiven 
 Unpublished locomotive builder lists (mostly originally compiled by Dr. Ing. Bernhard Schmeiser and added with later obtained supplementary information)
 American Locomotive Company (ALCo) Works List (Harward Business School copy 1948)
 Anjubault / Corpet Louvet Works List
 Baldwin Works List (copy 1833–1956 compiled from original Baldwin order list)
 Batignolles Châtillon, Nantes, St. Joseph Works List
 Borsig Works List
 A.Cail Works List
 Carels Works List
 Chrzanów Works List
 Couillet Works List
 Decauville Works List
 Elsässische Maschinenbau Gesellschaft / Societe Alsacienne de Construction Mecaniques Belfort, Graffenstaden, Mulhouse Works List
 Esslingen Works List
 Falcon Works List
 Fives Lille Works List
 Gouin / Batignolles Works List
 Henschel Works List
 Jung Works List
 Kerr Stuart & Co, LD Works List by Frank Jux 1991
 J.A.Maffei Works List
 La Meuse Works List
 Etablissement A. Pinguely Works List
 Schneider & Cie, Le Creusot Works List
 Schwartzkopff (BMAG) Works List
 Tubize Works List
 Weidknecht et Compagnie Works List

References 

History of rail transport in Morocco
600 mm gauge railways in Morocco
Metre gauge railways in Morocco
750 mm gauge railways in Morocco